Kate Hornsey (born 19 October 1981, in Hobart) is an Australian former three-time world champion, dual Olympian and Olympic silver medal-winning rower.

Club and national rowing
Hornsey took up rowing when she was 12 years old in New Norfolk, Tasmania. Her senior rowing was from New Norfolk club and the Mercantile Rowing Club in Melbourne.

Hornsey was selected in the Tasmanian representative VIIIs who raced for the Queen's Cup at the Australian Rowing Championships on seven occasions from 2003 to 2008 and in 2014. She stroked all six Tasmanian Women's VIIIs who competed at the Interstate Regattas between 2004 and 2014.

International representative rowing career

World championships
The typical squad changes that occur after an Olympic year as rowers take breaks or step away happened after Athens 2004 and Hornsey took her opportunities. She was selected in both the W4- and the W8+ for the 2005 World Rowing Championships in Gifu Japan. Both crews took gold with Hornsey stroking the four to her first World Championship title. The following year at Eton Dorney 2006 Horsney stroked both the eight and the four. The W8+ took bronze behind the US and Germany while the W4- won both their heat and final giving Hornsey and Robyn Selby Smith their second World Champion title in this boat class in successive years.

Horsney raced in the Australian women's eight at the 2007 World Championships to a fourth placing. She didn't compete in 2009 but at Lake Karapiro at the  2010 World Rowing Championships she stroked the Australian W4- to a silver medal. She repeated this feat at Bled 2011 earning a 2nd consecutive world silver alongside Pauline Frasca. At those same 2011 Championships she won a bronze medal in the W2- paired with Sarah Tait.

Olympics
Hornsey's first Australian Olympic selection was for Beijing 2008 when she rowed in the Australian women's eight who finished sixth.  In March 2012 she was selected in the coxless pair with Sarah Tait, the pair took the silver medal at the 2012 Olympic Games in London.

Hornsey announced her retirement from competitive rowing on 24 October 2014.

References

Footnotes

1981 births
Living people
Australian female rowers
Sportspeople from Hobart
Rowers at the 2008 Summer Olympics
Rowers at the 2012 Summer Olympics
Olympic medalists in rowing
Olympic silver medalists for Australia
Medalists at the 2012 Summer Olympics
World Rowing Championships medalists for Australia